Desiderius, also known as Daufer or Dauferius (born  – died ), was king of the Lombards in northern Italy, ruling from 756 to 774. The Frankish king of renown, Charlemagne, married Desiderius's daughter and subsequently conquered his realm. Desiderius is remembered for this connection to Charlemagne and for being the last Lombard ruler to exercise regional kingship.

Rise to power
Born in Brescia, Desiderius was originally a royal officer, the dux of Tuscia and he became king after the death of Aistulf in 756. At that time, Aistulf's predecessor, Ratchis, left his monastic retreat of Montecassino and tried to seize the kingdom, but Desiderius put his revolt down quickly with the support of Pope Stephen II. At his coronation, Desiderius promised to restore many lost papal towns to the Holy See and even enlarge the Papal State.

By 757, Desiderius began securing his power, taking what historian Walter Goffart terms, "vigorous steps to suppress resistance to himself in the powerful duchies of Spoleto, in central Italy, and Benevento, to the south." When the upstart, Liutprand Duke of Benevento, who despised Desiderius, challenged his kingship and threatened to place himself under Pippin's protection, Desiderius obtained naval assistance from Byzantium and put an end to Luitprand's defiant actions. The Lombard king then granted Luitprand's former duchy to his foe's son, Arechis. In that same year, Desiderius deposed Alboin of Spoleto and exercised the ducal powers there himself. Seeking, like his predecessors, to extend the Lombard power in Italy, he came into collision with the papacy and the southern duchies. In the August of 759, Desiderius made his son Adelchis associate King of Lombardy. 

Shortly after visiting Rome, where he prayed at the tomb of St. Peter, Desiderius "returned to the aggressive expansive policy of his predecessors." He even negotiated with Byzantium in an arrangement that would have eroded papal authority and resulted in further territorial loss for the Holy See in Rome. Sometime in 760, envoys from Pippin convinced Desiderius to return some of the cities he captured back to the papacy, but the Lombard king did not follow through on his promises.

Appointing Antipope Philip
Intervening in the crisis that ensued after the death of Pope Paul I in 767, Desiderius seized a priest named Philip from the Monastery of St. Vitus on the Esquiline Hill in Rome on Sunday, July 31, 768, and summarily appointed him pope. Antipope Philip was not recognized and failed to gain a significant following, so he left the same day and returned to his monastery, where he was never heard from or seen again.

Carolingian Intervention
While Pippin’s previous military campaigns in Italy against Desiderius' Lombard predecessors had been successful, the subsequent relations between the papacy (aligned with the Carolingians) and the Lombards were correspondingly strained and in 773, Pope Hadrian openly broke with king Desiderius. When Desiderius responded by moving against the papal cities, Hadrian immediately appealed to Charlemagne for help against the Lombards. Since the Lombards had blocked the passage through the Alps, Pope Hadrian had to send his embassy by sea; they were commissioned to remind Charlemagne that he was the protector of the papacy. 

Originally, Charlemagne had remained on amicable terms with the Lombards, having been married to Desiderius’ daughter, Desiderata. Despite not liking the alliance between Lombards and Franks, Stephen III grudgingly maintained positive diplomatic standing with both kings, but his death in February 772 and the elevation of Pope Hadrian, who wished to undermine this relationship, altered the political environment. Hadrian hedged his bets and took measures to provoke Desiderius; actions designed to make him take an aggressive stance against the Holy See so an appeal could be made for Frankish assistance. Upon hearing the call for help, Charlemagne obliged the Holy See. Carloman's death also changed the situation. It seems the widow of Charlemagne’s brother (Carloman) and her children had taken refuge with Desiderius, who—so it was alleged in the Liber Pontificalis—intended to proclaim a Frankish successor. According to historian Roger Collins, the veracity of this claim can be questioned as a possible piece of disinformation from the papacy "intended to ensure the Frankish king’s help against the Lombards."

During the spring of 773, Charlemagne sent two Frankish armies against the Lombards and after an eight month siege, captured the capital of Pavia and Desiderius himself.  Charlemagne subsequently exiled the Lombard king to the abbey of Corbie in northern France, and as “king of the Franks”, added the title “and of the Lombards”, lengthening his moniker. When Charlemagne took the title rex Langobardorum, it marked the first time a Germanic king adopted the title of a kingdom he had conquered. Although Charlemagne had the power to destroy the Lombards outright, he instead permitted them to "retain their laws and pardoned those who were traitors." In the end, Desiderius's ambitions brought about the end of the Lombard kingdom and he was the final Lombard king on record.

Family

He married Ansa (or Ansia) and, as well as a son, had five daughters:

Anselperga (or Anselberga), abbess of San Salvatore monastery of Brescia
Adelperga (or Adelberga), married Arechis II of Benevento
Liutperga (also Liutpirc or Liutberga), married Tassilo III of Bavaria
Desiderata (maybe Gerperga or Gerberga), married Charlemagne in 770, was repudiated (a medieval form of divorce) in 771
Adelchis (or Adalgis), patrician in Constantinople
Desidana, who died under attack.

Legacy
Today, the legacy of Desiderius still has significance in Italy. The beautiful monastic church of San Salvatore in Brescia, a testament to Lombard architecture still enduring, was constructed by Desiderius. His name in Italian--"Desiderio"--directly translates to "desire" in English. In the tragedy Adelchi, written by renowned Italian novelist and Poet Alessandro Manzoni in 1822, Desiderius is portrayed as vain man, destroying his kingdom and legacy over his desire for power. His son Adelchi (also called Adalgis) is torn over his father's will and his desire for peace, and dies of starvation. In the play, the author expresses regret that Desiderius and Lombards failed to unite the Italian peninsula.
Dante Alighieri in Paradiso VI (line 95) refers to Desiderius as the "Lombard tooth" (or "snake") who bit the Holy Church and was subsequently defeated by Charlemagne.

References

Notes

Citations

Bibliography

 
 
 
 
 
 
 
 
 
 

 

 
 
 
 

720 births
780s deaths
Year of birth uncertain
Year of death uncertain
8th-century Lombard monarchs

Lombard warriors
8th-century dukes of Spoleto